Mir Emad (born Emad al-Molk Qazvini Hasani,‎ 1554 – August 15, 1615) is perhaps the most celebrated Persian calligrapher. He was born in Qazvin, Iran. It is believed that the Nastaʿlīq style reached its highest elegance in Mir Emad's works. These are amongst the finest specimens of Nastaʿlīq calligraphy and are kept in several museums in the world.

Early life and education 
Mir Emad was born in Qazvin, where he had his early education. Mir Emad's family had librarian and accountant positions in Safavid court. He was trained in calligraphy at first by Isa Rangkar and then Malek Deylami. Mir Emad later on moved to Tabriz to study with Mohammad Hossein Tabrizi. Afterward, he traveled to Ottoman Turkey, Baghdad, Halab and Hijaz. He returned to Semnan and worked as a scribe in Shah Abbas's library and later on his court in the capital of Isfahan.

Rivalry with Ali Reza Abbasi 
In Shah Abbas's court, Mir Emad was not the only calligrapher. Ali Reza Abbasi Tabrizi, another famous calligrapher, was also under Shah's patronage. Ali Reza Abbasi's was also a pupil of Mohammad Hossein Tabrizi (Mir Emad's teacher) and later on became Mir Emad's opponent.

Death 
Mir Emad was later accused of being Sunni, a branch of Islam which was not tolerated under Safavids and implicitly sentenced to death by Shah Abbas. In a night, on his way to Hamam, Mir Emad was assassinated by Masud Beik Mesgar Qazvini and for several days no one dared to bury his corpse. Finally his pupil, Abu Torab Khattat Esfahani, buried him in Maghsoudbeyk mosque. He was not allowed to build a mausoleum for Mir Emad.

Works and legacy 
"Adab al-Masq", a dissertation on penmanship, is attributed to Mir Emad. Goharshad, Mir Emad's daughter, was also an adept calligrapher. So was her husband, Mir Mohammad Ali and her sons Mir Rashid, Mir Abd al-Razzaq and Mir Yahya. Mir Emad's son, Mirza Ebrahim, is also known to be a calligrapher. So is Mohammad Amin, Mirza Ebrahim's son.

See also
Persian calligraphy

References

16th-century calligraphers of Safavid Iran
People from Qazvin
1554 births
1615 deaths
Iranian scribes
17th-century calligraphers of Safavid Iran
17th-century Iranian painters
16th-century Iranian painters